The Chaco puffbird (Nystalus striatipectus) is a species of bird in the family Bucconidae, the puffbirds, nunlets, and nunbirds. It is found Argentina, Bolivia, Brazil, and Paraguay.

Taxonomy and systematics

The International Ornithological Committee (IOC) treats Nystalus striatipectus as a monotypic species. However, the South American Classification Committee of the American Ornithological Society (SACC), the Clements taxonomy, and BirdLife International's Handbook of the Birds of the World (HBW) all treat it as the junior subspecies of spot-backed puffbird, N. maculatus striatipectus.

Description

It has a dark brown crown with bold buffy spangles and a very pale rufous collar on the hindneck. Its upperparts and wing coverts are dark brown with a few buffy spangles and bars. The long, narrow, tail has narrow black and buffy bands. The face is mostly off-white with heavy dusky streaks; it has a buffy supercilium. The chin is white and the throat, upper breast, and sides of the neck are pale orange-red. The rest of the underparts are white with black streaks on the breast and flanks. The bill is mostly red, the eye pale yellow, and the feet brownish olive.

Distribution and habitat

The Chaco puffbird is found in the departments of Cochabamba, Chuquisaca, and Santa Cruz of south-central and southeastern Boliva, in the south-central Brazilian state of Mato Grosso do Sul, in western Paraguay, and in northwestern Argentina as far south as Córdoba Province. It is a bird of the Gran Chaco, where it inhabits dry subtropical and transitional forest and isolated woodland patches. It is not known to migrate.

Behavior

Feeding

The Chaco puffbird hunts by sallying from a low perch to capture prey on the ground or foliage. Its diet is mostly insects including caterpillars.

Breeding

The Chaco puffbird breeds in October in Paraguay and between January and February in Bolivia. It nests in a leaf-lined cavity in a soil bank or level ground. The clutch size is two or three eggs.

Vocalization

The Chaco puffbird's song is a "disyllabic 3-note whistle, 'tuhú tuhú tuhú, often sung as a duet or by three birds.

Status

The IUCN follows HBW in treating the Chaco puffbird as a subspecies of spot-backed puffbird; the spot-backed is assessed as being of Least Concern. Taken as a whole, it has a very large range. Its population has not been quantified but is believed to be stable. It is common in much of its range though apparently rare in Paraguay.

References

Chaco puffbird
Birds of the Gran Chaco
Chaco puffbird
Taxa named by Philip Sclater
Taxobox binomials not recognized by IUCN